The Vanitha Viththi was a Sinhala language weekly newspaper in Ceylon published by Times of Ceylon Limited (TOCL). It was founded in 1957 and was published from Colombo. In 1966 it had an average net sales of 23,215. It had an average circulation of 30,507 in 1973.

TOCL was nationalised by the Sri Lankan government in August 1977. The state-run TOCL faced financial and labour problems and on 31 January 1985 it and its various publications closed down.

The magazine's first editor was Eva Ranaweera.

References

1957 establishments in Ceylon
Defunct Sinhala-language newspapers published in Sri Lanka
Defunct weekly newspapers published in Sri Lanka
Publications established in 1957
Times of Ceylon Limited